Folias Cariocas is a 1948 Brazilian musical comedy film directed by Manoel Jorge and Hélio Thys. It stars Lauro Borges, Dercy Gonçalves and Silva Filho.

References

External links
 

1948 films
1948 musical comedy films
Brazilian musical comedy films
Brazilian black-and-white films